The 1991 Cornell Big Red football team was an American football team that represented Cornell University during the 1991 NCAA Division I-AA football season. Cornell tied for fourth in the Ivy League. 

In its second season under head coach Jim Hofher, the team compiled a 5–5 record and outscored opponents 218 to 181. Mark Broderick, Greg Finnegan and Scott Oliaro were the team captains. 

Cornell's 4–3 conference record tied for fourth in the Ivy League standings. The Big Red outscored Ivy opponents 139 to 124. 

The Big Red entered the year ranked 20th in the national rankings, but dropped out of the top 20 after an opening-week loss and remained unranked through the end of the season.

Cornell played its home games at Schoellkopf Field in Ithaca, New York.

Schedule

References

Cornell
Cornell Big Red football seasons
Cornell Big Red football